Bismuth(III) nitrate is a salt composed of bismuth in its cationic +3 oxidation state and nitrate anions. The most common solid form is the pentahydrate. It is used in the synthesis of other bismuth compounds. It is available commercially. It is the only nitrate salt formed by a group 15 element, indicative of bismuth's metallic nature.

Preparation and reactions
Bismuth nitrate can be prepared by the reaction of bismuth metal and concentrated nitric acid.

 Bi + 4HNO3 →  Bi(NO3)3   + 2H2O + NO

It dissolves in nitric acid but is readily hydrolysed to form a range of oxynitrates when the pH increases above 0.

It is also soluble in acetone, acetic acid and glycerol but practically insoluble in ethanol and ethyl acetate.

Some uses in organic synthesis have been reported for example the nitration of aromatic compounds and selective oxidation of sulfides to sulfoxides.

Bismuth nitrate forms insoluble complexes with pyrogallol and cupferron and these have been the basis of gravimetric methods of determining bismuth content.

On heating bismuth nitrate can decompose forming nitrogen dioxide, NO2.

Structure 
The crystal form is triclinic, and contains 10 coordinate Bi3+, (three bidentate nitrate ions and four water molecules).

References

Bismuth nitrate
Nitrates